The Balmain Tigers (also known as the Sydney Tigers from 1995–96) are a rugby league club based in the inner-western Sydney suburb of Balmain. They were a founding member of the New South Wales Rugby League and one of the most successful in the history of the premiership, with eleven titles. In 1999 they formed a joint venture club with the Western Suburbs Magpies club to form the Wests Tigers for competition in the National Rugby League (NRL). They no longer field any senior teams in the lower divisions. At the time of the joint venture only South Sydney Rabbitohs and the St George Dragons had won more titles than the Tigers.

The club's home grounds are at present Leichhardt Oval, in Lilyfield, and T.G Milner Sportsground, in Marsfield.

History

Foundation club
In 1908 Australia's first season of rugby league began in Sydney and the Balmain club was one of nine foundation clubs. One of the club's founders was future Premier of New South Wales, John Storey. Their home ground was Birchgrove Park. Balmain reached their first Grand Final in only the second year in the competition against the previous year's champions, South Sydney, but would protest as the match was scheduled as a warm-up for a Kangaroos vs. Wallabies game at Souths' home ground. Even though both teams agreed to boycott the match,  Souths turned up and were officially awarded the Premiership when they kicked off to an empty half of the field.

The distinctive black and gold colours of their 1908 thin striped jerseys led their fans to quickly nickname them "The Tigers". 
Though it is claimed they were also known as "The Watersiders" in the early days, this appears a moniker that was used by newspaper journalists rather than Balmain supporters and fans. It seemed to be used to refer not only to most Balmain sporting teams (Lacrosse, Rugby Union, Cricket etc.), but also to Balmain residents in general. The following boxing quote is a good example, taken from "Sydney Sportsman" 11 Dec, 1901. "On Xmas Eve, Cam Brookes and Ike Stewart, heavyweights, meet at the Golden Gate, Brookes is another Balmain boy, and the watersiders are sure to follow him to town in shoals." As late as the 1930s some journalists were still using both "Tigers" and "Watersiders" in the same article.
One of the earliest newspaper references to Balmain & Tigers appears in "The Arrow" 12 August 1911. The journalist "Gulliver" in his "Football Notes" column reports;
"W.G.B. (Balmain) writes: "Who said Balmain
weren't rough? Here is an essay on "The Tiger"
written by an eight year old boy at one of the
local schools.:- The tiger has large padded feet
so that he can steal softly upon his prey...The
tiger is like the Balmain footballers, because
he has black and yellow stripes. He is very wild,
but not so wild  as the Balmain footballers."

After a string of poor years, the Tigers managed a strong turn-around to become a dominant force in the Australian Rugby League with the club's first, second and third Premierships coming in successive years dominating the 1915, 1916 and 1917 seasons. Tigers dominance continued winning the 1919 and 1920 seasons comfortably. When they won the 1924 premiership this would be the last success for Balmain for over a decade to come.

Golden era
It would not be until 1939 the Tigers won back the Premiership smashing Souths 33-4. The weekend of the Final will also be remembered for the invasion of Poland by Germany which led to England and Australia going to War.

Post-World War II marked a golden era for Balmain with the Tigers reaching five consecutive Grand Finals winning three of them. In the 1944 Grand Final, the Tigers beat the strong favourites Newtown 19-16. Balmain reached the Grand Final again in 1945 but fell at the last hurdle against Easts 22-18. The loss was not long remembered as the Tigers went on to take out the next two seasons, beating St George 13-12 in 1946, and Canterbury 13-9 in 1947. On the hunt for a third successive title, they lost to Wests in 1948.

1960s–1970s
The Tigers would appear in several Grand Final matches throughout the 1950s and 1960s but were just another victim to the mighty St. George Dragons eleven-year streak of Premiership wins in this period, losing in 1956, 1964 and 1966. When the Tigers did take out the competition in the 1969 NSWRFL season it was a classy 11–2 defeat of favourites Souths who boasted 11 internationals, this would signal the last time Balmain would ever win a Grand Final. The side was captained by Peter Provan, brother of Norm, and coached by Leo Nosworthy.

The 1970s were not a great era for the Tigers. The wooden spoon had not been in Balmain since 1911, but it returned in club history when the Tigers won only 4 games and had 2 draws in 1974 following several poor years. That period between 1911 and 1974 remains the longest wooden spoon drought for any team. In 1976 things looked more hopeful when Balmain began the year with an undefeated run through the pre-season "Wills Cup" competition. The side also won the 1976 Amco Cup knockout tournament in front of a then-record crowd of 21,600, beating North Sydney. The Tigers won eight straight games and led the competition, but a midseason slump left the Tigers in the same position as in 1975 and they failed to make the finals.

1980s–1990s
The Tigers consistently made the finals series in the 1980s reaching the play-offs in 1983, 1985, 1986, 1987, 1988 and 1989.

On 4 August 1985 a crowd of 21,707 set a new ground record for Leichhardt Oval.

In 1986, one of Balmain's players, Great Britain captain Garry Schofield topped the try-scorers list for the season.
The 1988 Great Britain Lions tour captain Ellery Hanley was signed by the Balmain Tigers to play the remaining rounds of the 1988 NSWRFL season for them once his representative commitments were fulfilled. The Tigers reached the 1988 Grand Final, the first time since the 1969 success, winning a lot of fans along the way with a number of 'backs to the wall' performances winning four consecutive sudden death matches in just 3 weeks. The top five teams out of the premiership table went on to the final series, and this was the first time since 1979 that a team in fifth position had progressed to the Grand Final. In 1988 the Tigers were deemed certain to miss the finals with 8 games left in the regular season. The Tigers remarkably only lost a single game from that point onwards reaching the Grand Final against Canterbury, only to be denied the trophy in a controversial 24–12 loss. Canterbury player, Terry Lamb, is still remembered by fans for knocking out the legendary Ellery Hanley with a high shot in back play midway through the first half. The Tigers were leading the game at the time.

The side would again make the Grand Final in 1989 but this time as favourites. The '89 Final is regarded by many as one of the best in the history of Rugby League. In a controversial affair, the side lost in extra time against the Canberra Raiders after being ahead 12–2 at half time.

After the heartbreak of the 1989 Grand Final, the Tigers never regained their dominating form (although they did make the finals again in 1990) and went through a rebuilding phase following the retirement of star players Wayne Pearce, Garry Jack, Steve Roach and David Brooks who had all played over 100 games for the club over a period of 10 years or more. The stars were missed as Balmain finished second-last in 1993 and got the wooden spoon in 1994.

The departure of coach Warren Ryan at the end of 1990 was a key turning point for the club. Balmain hired the famous former Wallabies coach-come-radio announcer Alan Jones as a coach in 1991. As Paul Sironen admitted years later in his autobiography, the 'running rugby' style of Jones was too simplistic for the structured defensive patterns which had developed in rugby league during the 1980s. Jones also began a controversial clear-out of some of the other Tigers stars who had not retired, notably the Kiwi international Gary Freeman, and often replaced them with inexperienced juniors who were not yet really ready for first-grade football. By the time Jones was sacked as coach at the end of 1993, incoming coach Wayne Pearce inherited a massive problem which was only getting worse.

In drastic action, Balmain released 31 players at the end of 1994 and moved to Parramatta Stadium as the 'Sydney Tigers'. The Tigers stayed at Parramatta Stadium for 2 seasons before heading back to Leichhardt Oval. The Tigers only averaged 6,565 people attending home games at Parramatta Stadium in what was regarded as a failed experiment.

At the end of the 1996 ARL season the League's chief executive John Quayle resigned and was replaced by Balmain president (and former hooker) Neil Whittaker.

Joint Venture

Although things picked up for the club in following years, the Australian Rugby League/Super League war would spell trouble for the club. 1999 was a tumultuous year for the Balmain Tigers. The season began with a dark cloud hanging over the 17 clubs. The Super League/ARL compromise had left 1999 as the last season before the 14 team NRL competition began and with it came the much talked about criteria. On-field Balmain was struggling with a savage injury toll that forced the Tigers to use over 40 players throughout the season.

In July 1999, the option of forming a joint venture with fellow foundation club, the Western Suburbs Magpies was put to the Football Club members. The members ultimately voted in favour of a joint venture. As it turned out Balmain was in the top 14 clubs under the criteria (ahead of current NRL teams Penrith and South Sydney) but would have continued to struggle to be financially competitive with bigger clubs. The decision to enter a joint venture saw a crowd of 15,240 turn-out in atrocious conditions to watch the Tigers play their last home game in first grade at Leichhardt Oval as the Balmain Tigers.

Balmain's final game in the top grade as a sole entity was in Round 26 1999 against the Canberra Raiders at Bruce Stadium which ended in a 42–14 defeat.  At the time of the club's exit, Balmain were the third most successful club in the competition's history with eleven premierships.  Only St. George and South Sydney had won more premierships.

The new entity, Wests Tigers, made it to the 2005 NRL Grand Final and defeated the North Queensland Cowboys 30-16.

Club today
The club currently competes in both of the junior New South Wales Rugby League competitions, the Harold Matthews Cup and S. G. Ball Cup competitions, recording consecutive SG Ball premierships in 2012–13. From 2000, they played in the NSW Cup as a merged team with the Ryde-Eastwood Hawks and competed as the Balmain Ryde-Eastwood Tigers. From season 2013 onwards, Balmain does not have a senior representative side, having formed a joint venture with the Western Suburbs Magpies to form a Wests Tigers team.

In October 2018, it was reported that the Balmain Leagues Club was placed into voluntary administration placing the future of the Balmain side at risk.  It was also revealed that Balmain was required to pay a $2.5 million loan to the NRL by November 2021.  The report followed on from the news that for over 10 years the leagues club at Rozelle had sat dormant as different shareholders and developers struggled to negotiate deals on what to do with the land.  Both the Harold Matthews Cup and S. G. Ball Cup Balmain sides who still compete were reportedly not to be in any danger in the short term future.

On 21 March 2019, it was revealed that Wests Ashfield accepted responsibility for the Balmain club's outstanding loan to the NRL. Inner West Mayor Darcy Byrne said of the news "The Tigers were about to become extinct, but the club can now continue as a rugby league entity and to be a partner in Wests Tigers for many decades to come".

On 24th August 2019 a Deed of Amalgamation was issued between Wests Ashfield and Balmain Tigers. Under the deed, Ashfield will clear all outstanding debts to the NRL, will continue to fund Balmain Tigers Rugby League for a number of years and will pursue all avenues to re-open a venue on the Rozelle Premises.

Balmain Tigers League's Club
A foundation club of the NSWRFL, Balmain Tigers Rugby League Football Club was established on 23 January 1908 at Balmain Town Hall. The club has competed in the NSWRL competitions for 110 years, winning 11 first grade premierships.

Also operating a club known as Balmain Leagues Club, the operating business was built in 1957. The original site was situated on the corner of Victoria Road and Darling Street, Rozelle. The club was the venue for a celebration party after Wests Tigers won the NRL Premiership in 2005.

The Leagues Club closed its doors on 28 March 2010, with the former club site now vacant after receiving a notice to vacate the site to make way for the proposed Rozelle Village development to go ahead.

Balmain Leagues Club entered voluntary administration on 26 October 2018.

In September 2019 members of both Balmain Leagues Club and Wests Ashfield Leagues club voted almost unanimously for an amalgamation to take place. Once ratified by office of Liquor and Gaming, Balmain Leagues Club will cease to exist.

Coaching register

Players of note

In May 2003 the Balmain Tigers Team of the Century was named: 

Keith Barnes (c)
Arthur Halloway
Ben Elias
Larry Corowa
Wayne Pearce
Tom Bourke
Arthur Patton
Paul Sironen
Tim Brasher

Charles Fraser
Harry Bath
Peter Provan
Jim Craig
Steve Roach
Bob Boland
Pat Devery
Arthur Beetson
Norm "Latchem" Robinson
Gary Freeman

2005 the members of the Team of the Century became the inaugural inductees to the Balmain Tigers Hall of Fame. In addition to those inductees, a further five were inducted at the inaugural Hall of Fame dinner on 17 March 2005. These were:

Reg Latta
Joe Jorgenson
Bill Marsh

Dave Bolton
Garry Jack

A further five were inducted at the Hall of Fame dinner on 29 March 2006. These were:

Jack 'Junker' Robinson
Fred de Belin
Billy Bischoff

Garry Leo
John Spencer

A further five were inducted at the Hall of Fame dinner on 20 March 2007. These were:

Trevor Ryan
Geoff Starling
David Brooks

Bob Craig
Sid Goodwin

A further six were inducted at the Hall of Fame dinner in 2008. These were:

John Davidson
Laurie Fagan
Jack Hampstead

Bob Mara
Neil Pringle
Sid Ryan

A further four were inducted in 2009:

Jack Spencer
Len Killeen

Keith Outten
Kerry Hemsley

Stadiums
The Tigers have had several 'Home game grounds' used in the club's history. The club spent a majority of the early days at Birchgrove Oval (1908 – 1933, and in 1942), with short stints at Wentworth Park (1930) and at Drummoyne Oval (1932–1933) in that time.

In 1934, they moved to Leichhardt Oval, where the majority played until they merged with the Western Suburbs Magpies at the end of the 1999 season. In this time, they had short stints at Sydney Showground (1971–1972) and Parramatta Stadium (1995–1996).

The clubs' existing lower grade sides play home games at Leichhardt Oval and TG Milner Sportsground in Marsfield.

Here is a list of their grounds used as their primary use in first grade:
 Birchgrove Oval (1908 – 1929; 1931 – 1932; 1942)
 Wentworth Park (1930)
 Drummoyne Oval (1932–1933)
 Leichhardt Oval (1934 – 1941; 1943 – 1970; 1973 – 1994; 1997 – 1999)
 Sydney Sports Ground (1971–1972)
 Parramatta Stadium (1995–1996)

Records

Club

Biggest Wins vs All Teams

Biggest Losses vs All Teams

Individual
Most appearances
Paul Sironen: 247 (1985–1998)
Garry Jack: 243 (1982–1992, 1995)
Ben Elias: 233 (1982–1994)
Keith Barnes: 194 (1955–1968)
Wayne Pearce: 192 (1980–1990)
Charles Fraser: 185 (1910–1926)
Steve Roach: 185 (1982–1992)
Tim Brasher: 185 (1989–1997)
Reg Latta: 175 (1916–1926, 1928–1930)
David Brooks: 174 (1983–1992)

Most tries in a match
Sid Goodwin: 5 vs University at Leichhardt Oval on 4 April 1935
Arthur Patton: 5 vs Eastern Suburbs at SCG on 12 August 1944
Bob Lulham: 5 vs Parramatta at Leichhardt Oval on 2 August 1947
David Topliss: 5 vs Newtown at Henson Park on 7 August 1977

Most tries in a season
Bobby Lulham: 28 in NSWRFL season 1947

Most tries for club
Arthur Patton: 95
Sid Goodwin: 86
Bob Lulham: 85
Tim Brasher: 82
Jack 'Junker' Robinson: 78
Bob Mara: 70

Most goals in a match
Frank Dreise: 11 vs Wests at Pratten Park on 29 July 1944
Keith Barnes: 11 vs Norths at Sydney Sports Ground on 24 July 1960

Most goals in a season
Len Killeen: 84 in NSWRFL season 1969

Most Goals For Club
Keith Barnes: 742

Most points in a match
Frank Dreise: 22 vs Wests at Pratten Park on 29 July 1944
Keith Barnes: 22 vs Norths at Sydney Sports Ground on 24 July 1960
Ross Conlon: 22 vs Wests at Leichhardt Oval on 4 April 1985

Most points in a season
Len Killeen: 207 (9 tries, 84 goals, 6 field goals) in NSWRFL season 1969

Most points for club
Keith Barnes: 1,519 (11 tries, 742 goals, 1 field goal)

Award winners
Wayne Pearce (Rothmans Medal, 1985)

Honours
Premierships (1915, 1916, 1917, 1920, 1924, 1939, 1944, 1946, 1947, 1969)
Runners Up (1909, 1936, 1945, 1948, 1956, 1964, 1966, 1988, 1989)
City Cup (1917, 1923)
Craven Mild Cup (1967, 1976)
Amco Cup (1976, 1985, 1987)

Major sponsors
Camperford (1977)
Avis (1978–1980)
Sharp (1981–1982)
Saxonvale Wines (1983–1985)
Alpha Micro Computers (1986–1987)
Philips (1988–1993)
MLC mobiles (1994–1995)
Meriton Apartments (1997–1999)

Notable fans
Dawn Fraser, Olympic swimmer
Anthony Field, founding member of The Wiggles
John Kerr, 18th Governor General of Australia
Laurie Nichols
Harry Triguboff
Neville Wran, 35th Premier of New South Wales

First-grade players (1908-1999)

Balmain Tigers District Junior Rugby League

The Balmain Tigers District Junior Rugby League is one of the oldest Junior Rugby League Competitions in Australia. It administers an affiliation of junior rugby league clubs in the inner west and inner north-west of Sydney.

The league caters for age groups from under 6's to A Grade (opens). The Senior competition (Under 13's – A Grade) is a combined inner Sydney competition with the St. George, South Sydney & Eastern Suburbs District Junior Rugby League. Under 6's to Under 8's is a non-competitive competition. Under 9's to Under 12's play in a modified competition.

As of 2009, there were ten clubs in the Balmain Tigers Junior Rugby League, with over 120 teams. These clubs are;
Balmain PCYC (formerly known as Balmain Police Boys)
Carlingford Cougars (formerly known as St Gerards Carlingford)
Concord-Burwood United Wolves (merger of Burwood Utd & Concord Utd in the 1990s, former Western Suburbs junior clubs)
Dundas Shamrocks Junior Rugby League Football Club (formerly known as St Patricks Dundas)
Five Dock RSL Dockers (former Western Suburbs junior club)
Holy Cross Rhinos (Ryde)
Leichhardt Juniors
Leichhardt Wanderers (known as Leichhardt Gladstone until the 1930s) who are the oldest continuously running junior league team in Australia – has fielded at least one team every year since 1913.
North Ryde Hawks
Strathfield Raiders
West Ryde-Denistone Stones
Enfield Federals (joined 2010, former Western Suburbs junior club)

Some extinct clubs that once played in the Balmain District junior competition include;
Drummoyne Sports (until the 1990s)
Balmain Waratahs (until the 1990s)
Ermington-Rydalmere (until the 1990s)
Glebe Police Boys (until the 1990s)
Balmain United (until the 1990s)
Cricketers Arms (until the 1990s – Darling St, Balmain – now known as Monkey Bar)
Sackville Sharks
Ryde District Devils (until the 1980s)
Birchgrove Scorpions (until the 1980s)
Gladesville Sports (until the 1980s)
West Ryde-Dundas
Rozelle Codocks (until the 1970s)
Pyrmont Colts (until the 1970s)
Glebe Shamrocks (aka St James Sports Club – until the 1970s)
Ryde CYO (until the 1970s)
Carlingford CYO (until the 1970s)
Balmain Airlines (until the 1970s)
Glebe Youth
Bing & Swing (Glebe, former Glebe district junior team – folded in 1930)
Balmain Iona (aka Rozelle Iona)
Drummoyne Rovers (1920s)
Rozelle Fernleigh (1920s)
Marist College Eastwood
OLHC Epping 
St Augustines Balmain

Some notable Balmain juniors include;
Wayne Pearce (Balmain Police Boys)
Paul Sironen (North Ryde)
Benny Elias (Holy Cross)
Dene Halatau (North Ryde, formerly of Wentworthville)
Robbie Farah (Leichhardt Wanderers, formerly of Enfield Federals)
Bronson Harrison (Leichhardt Wanderers & Balmain PCYC)
Josh Lewis (Leichhardt Wanderers)
Kurtley Beale (North Ryde)
Mitchell Pearce (North Ryde)
Alan Thompson (North Ryde)
Wayne Wigham (North Ryde)
Mark O'Neill (North Ryde & Dundas Shamrocks)
Kevin Hardwick (Ryde District Devils & Ermington-Rydalmere)
John Davidson (Birchgrove Scorpions & Ermington-Rydalmere)
Ron Ryan (North Ryde)

See also

Wests Tigers

References

Further reading

External links

 
-
1908 establishments in Australia